The 1984 Kansas City Chiefs season was the franchise's 15th season in the National Football League, the 22nd as the Kansas City Chiefs, and the 25th overall.

Pro Bowl safety Gary Barbaro became the most notable Chiefs player to defect to the rival United States Football League, signing with the New Jersey Generals on February 2 after sitting out the entire 1983 campaign due to a contract dispute. Barbaro's departure and the trade of cornerback Gary Green began a youth movement that produced the most vaunted secondary in team history. Cornerbacks Kevin Ross and Albert Lewis, and safeties Deron Cherry and Lloyd Burruss accounted for a combined 13 Pro Bowl appearances for the Chiefs in the years to come.

All-America defensive tackle Bill Maas and offensive tackle John Alt were both selected in the first round of the 1984 NFL Draft. Maas was named NFL Defensive Rookie of the Year, while Alt eventually became the cornerstone of the club's offensive line later in the decade. Kansas City's defense registered a team-record 11 sacks in a 10–6 win against Cleveland on September 30, coming one sack shy of the NFL single-game record.

Quarterback Bill Kenney suffered a broken thumb during the preseason and was sidelined until the season's seventh week. Second-year backup Quarterback Todd Blackledge opened the first six contests of the season and had the club at 3–3. Kenney returned to the starting lineup against the New York Jets on October 21, but inconsistency marked the rest of the season as the club dropped four of first five contests after his return. However, the team rattled off three consecutive wins to conclude the year at 8–8.

The Chiefs were also involved in infamy during the Week 10 game against the Seattle Seahawks, in which the Chiefs quarterbacks threw six interceptions, four of which were returned for touchdowns in a 45–0 loss.

Offseason

NFL Draft

Undrafted free agents

Personnel

Staff

Roster

Schedule

Preseason

Regular season 

Note: Intra-division opponents are in bold text.

Game summaries

Week 1: at Pittsburgh Steelers

Week 2: at Cincinnati Bengals

Week 3: vs. Los Angeles Raiders

Week 4: at Denver Broncos

Week 5: vs. Cleveland Browns

Week 6: vs. New York Jets

Week 7: vs. San Diego Chargers

Week 8: at New York Jets

Week 9: vs. Tampa Bay Buccaneers

Week 10: at Seattle Seahawks

Week 11: vs. Houston Oilers

Week 12: at Los Angeles Raiders

Week 13: at New York Giants

Week 14: vs. Denver Broncos

Week 15: vs. Seattle Seahawks

Week 16: at San Diego Chargers

Standings

References

External links 
 1984 Kansas City Chiefs at Pro-Football-Reference.com

Kansas City Chiefs
Kansas City Chiefs seasons
Kansas